WVVD-LP (99.1 FM) is a radio station licensed to Seffner, Florida, United States.  The station is currently owned by Iglesia Cristiana La Nueva Jerusalem.

References

External links
 

VVD-LP
Radio stations established in 2008
2008 establishments in Florida
VVD-LP